Chelsea railway station is located on the Frankston line in Victoria, Australia. It serves the south-eastern Melbourne suburb of Chelsea, and it opened on 4 February 1907.

History

Chelsea station opened on 4 February 1907 and, like the suburb itself, was named after Chelsea in London, England. The name was suggested by local farmer Bertha Black, whose mother was originally from Chelsea.

In 1977, boom barriers replaced interlocked gates at the former Chelsea Road level crossing, which was located at the Up end of the station. The interlocked frame was also abolished at this time, replaced by a control panel within the former signal box.

In 1984, the overhead wire for a siding at the station was removed and, in 1987, the siding was abolished.

In 2003, the control panel was permanently switched out.

On 4 May 2010, as part of the 2010/2011 State Budget, $83.7 million was allocated to upgrade Chelsea to a Premium Station, along with nineteen others. However, in March 2011, this was scrapped by the Baillieu Government.

On 9 December 2019, the Level Crossing Removal Project released designs for the removal of the Chelsea Road level crossing and the rebuilding of the station, with contracts for the removal of the level crossing signed two days later, on 11 December. In 2020, construction started and, on 25 July 2021, the station was closed for demolition. On 22 November of that year, the rebuilt station opened to passengers, along with nearby Edithvale and Bonbeach. The line was rebuilt below in a trench, with the level crossing permanently closed to road vehicles, and nearby Thames Promenade extended to the Nepean Highway.

Platforms and services

Chelsea has two side platforms. It is serviced by Metro Trains' Frankston line services.

Platform 1:
  all stations and limited express services to Flinders Street, Werribee and Williamstown

Platform 2:
  all stations services to Frankston

Transport links

Kinetic Melbourne operates one SmartBus route to and from Chelsea station, under contract to Public Transport Victoria:
  : to Westfield Airport West

Ventura Bus Lines operates three routes via Chelsea station, under contract to Public Transport Victoria:
 : to Mordialloc (off-peak only)
 : to Dandenong station
 : Edithvale – Aspendale Gardens

Gallery

References

External links

 Melway map at street-directory.com.au

Railway stations in Melbourne
Railway stations in Australia opened in 1907
Railway stations in the City of Kingston (Victoria)